Martin Davies (born 28 June 1974 in Swansea, Wales) is a Welsh footballer who played for Coventry City F.C. Cambridge United F.C. Rushden & Diamonds, Dover Athletic and Cambridge City. He was a professional with Coventry City F.C. for five years but never played a first team game, before playing his only 16 league appearances with Cambridge United F.C. . He then played 61 times for Rushden & Diamonds and continued playing non-league football with Dover Athletic, Cambridge City, Port Talbot, Corby and Stamford before retiring in 2009

After his retirement he went on to become head of goalkeeping at Cambridge United.
In January 2017 he returned to his hometown club Swansea City F.C. to become the u23 goalkeeper coach

References

Welsh footballers
Coventry City F.C. players
Cambridge United F.C. players
English Football League players
1974 births
Living people
Footballers from Swansea
Association football goalkeepers
Cambridge United F.C. non-playing staff 
Swansea City A.F.C. non-playing staff